This is a record of Sweden's results at the FIFA World Cup. The FIFA World Cup, sometimes called the Football World Cup or the Soccer World Cup, but usually referred to simply as the World Cup, is an international association football competition contested by the men's national teams of the members of Fédération Internationale de Football Association (FIFA), the sport's global governing body. The championship has been awarded every four years since the first tournament in 1930, except in 1942 and 1946, due to World War II.

The tournament consists of two parts, the qualification phase and the final phase (officially called the World Cup Finals). The qualification phase, which currently take place over the three years preceding the Finals, is used to determine which teams qualify for the Finals. The current format of the Finals involves 32 teams competing for the title, at venues within the host nation (or nations) over a period of about a month. The World Cup Finals is the most widely viewed sporting event in the world, with an estimated 715.1 million people watching the 2006 tournament final.

Sweden have been one of the more successful national teams in the history of the World Cup, having reached the top four on four occasions, and becoming runners-up on home ground in 1958. They have been present at 12 out of 21 World Cups by 2018.

Throughout the World Cup history, Brazil became Sweden's historical rival. The two countries have met each other seven times but Sweden never won, with five victories for the Brazilian side and two draws. Another historical opponent of Sweden in the finals is (West) Germany: four encounters, with three wins for Germany and one for Sweden.

Overall record

*Draws include knockout matches decided via penalty shoot-out. 
**Gold background color indicates that the tournament was won.
***Red border color indicates tournament was held on home soil.

By match

Record players

Top goalscorers

With his five goals in 1994, Kennet Andersson won the shared Bronze Boot at that tournament.

References

External links
Sweden at FIFA
World Cup Finals Statistics

Countries at the FIFA World Cup